In Love the Whitman Way is a studio album by Slim Whitman, released in 1968 on Imperial Records.

Track listing 
The album was issued in the United States by Imperial Records as a 12-inch long-playing record, catalog numbers LP-9375 (mono) and LP-12375 (stereo).

Arranged by Harol Bradley.

Charts

References 

1968 albums
Slim Whitman albums
Imperial Records albums